Sefid Tur-e Pain (also Romanized as Sefīd Ţūr-e Pā’īn) is a village in Khvosh Rud Rural District, Bandpey-ye Gharbi District, Babol County, Mazandaran Province, Iran. At the 2006 census, its population was 378, in 108 families.

References 

Populated places in Babol County